Borgo Santa Maria Immacolata is a small town located west of Pineto, in the province of Teramo, Abruzzo, Italy. Its population amounted to 2,491 in 2011 (Istat census).

References

Cities and towns in Abruzzo
Frazioni of the Province of Teramo